Megillah (scroll) may refer to:

Bible
The Book of Esther (Megillat Esther), read on the Jewish holiday of Purim
The Five Megillot
Megillat Antiochus

Rabbinic literature
Tractate Megillah in the Talmud.
Megillat Taanit, a tannaitic document listing Jewish days of celebration.

Other
, a musical by Itzik Manger in the style of Purim spiel

See also 
Magilla (disambiguation)